
Duquesne (old spelling Du Quesne, American spelling DuQuesne) is a family name derived from a northern dialectal form of French (Norman and Picard) meaning du chêne in French ("of the oak"), same as the surname Duchesne. It can refer to:

People
 Abraham de Bellebat, marquis du Quesne, governor of Martinique in 1716 (see list of colonial and departmental heads of Martinique)
 Abraham Duquesne ( – 1688), French admiral
 Antoine Duquesne (1941–2010), Belgian politician
 Fritz Joubert Duquesne (1877–1956), Boer and later German spy in World War I and World War II
 Jean du Quesne, the elder (died 1624), Huguenot refugee from Flanders who settled in England
 Jean du Quesne, the Younger (1575–1612), son of the above
 Jacques Duquesne (disambiguation), multiple people
 Michel-Ange Duquesne de Menneville, Marquis Du Quesne (c. 1700–1778), Governor General of New France (in present-day Canada)

Places

United States
 Duquesne, Arizona, now a ghost town
 Duquesne, Missouri, a village
 Duquesne, Pennsylvania, a city named after Marquis Duquesne
 Fort Duquesne, a French fort created in 1754 which eventually became the city of Pittsburgh
 Fort Duquesne (Minnesota), a former French fur trade post on the National Register of Historic Places

Grenada
 Duquesne River

Fictional characters
 Calleigh Duquesne, in the television series CSI: Miami
 Jacques Duquesne, true identity of the Swordsman (comics) in the Marvel Comics universe
 Marc "Blackie" DuQuesne, villain of the Skylark science fiction series of novels by E. E. "Doc" Smith

Sports
 Duquesne Country and Athletic Club, an American professional football team from 1895 to 1900
 Duquesne Country and Athletic Club (ice hockey), an American hockey team from 1895 to 1901
 Duquesne Dukes, athletic teams of Duquesne University
 Duquesne Athletic Club, a professional ice hockey team in Pittsburgh, Pennsylvania from 1908 to 1909
 Duquesne Gardens,  the main sports arena in Pittsburgh, Pennsylvania, in the first half of the 20th century
 Duquesne Baseball Field, Duquesne University

Other uses
 French ship Duquesne, eight ships and one cruiser class in the French Navy named after Abraham Duquesne
 Duquesne University, a private Catholic university in Pittsburgh, Pennsylvania
 Duquesne Club, a private social club in Pittsburgh, Pennsylvania, founded in 1873
 Duquesne Brewing Company (1899-1972), a brewery in Pittsburgh
 Duquesne Brewing Company, revived from the above company
 Duquesne (PRR), a Pennsylvania Railroad passenger train, later renamed the Keystone by Amtrak
 Duquesne Incline, an inclined plane railroad or funicular

Norman-language surnames